= SWNT =

SWNT may refer to:

- Single-walled carbon nanotube
- Scotland women's national football team
